Brian Arthur Greenhalgh (born 20 February 1947) is an English former professional footballer born in Chesterfield, Derbyshire, who played as a striker in the Football League for Preston North End, Aston Villa, Leicester City, Huddersfield Town, Cambridge United, AFC Bournemouth, Torquay United and Watford during the 1960s and 1970s.

Although retired Brian is currently a part-time scout for Newcastle United, and has scouted for Everton, Watford and Aston Villa. After leaving Watford he played non-league football for Dartford, Wealdstone and a number of other non-league clubs.

References

External links
 League stats at Neil Brown's site

1947 births
Living people
Footballers from Chesterfield
English footballers
Association football forwards
Preston North End F.C. players
Aston Villa F.C. players
Leicester City F.C. players
Huddersfield Town A.F.C. players
Cambridge United F.C. players
AFC Bournemouth players
Torquay United F.C. players
Watford F.C. players
English Football League players
Watford F.C. non-playing staff